JSR may refer to:
Jai Shri Raam

Computing
 Jump to subroutine, an assembly language instruction
 Java Specification Request, documents describing proposed additions to the Java platform

Research, science & technology
 Joint spectral radius, in mathematics
 Jonathan's Space Report, an online newsletter
 Journal of Sedimentary Research
 The Journal of Sex Research
 Journal for the Study of Religion
Journal of Service Research
 Journal of Synchrotron Radiation
 Journal of Spacecraft and Rockets

Other uses
 Jacobinte Swargarajyam, a 2016 Indian Malayalam language film
 Jessore Airport, in Bangladesh
 Jet Set Radio, a video game
 John Septimus Roe Anglican Community School, in Perth, Western Australia
 Jai Shri Ram, a popular Hindu slogan and greeting